Los Rieleros Del Norte ("The Railers of the North") are a Mexican three-time Grammy-nominated Regional Mexican band from Ojinaga, Chihuahua, Mexico. They are based in El Paso, Texas. They specialize in the Norteño-Sax genre.

History
They formed the band in Ojinaga, Chihuahua in 1980 and later moved to Texas, and remain one of the oldest norteño bands still active today (Along with Conjunto Primavera, Los Tigres del Norte, Los Huracanes del Norte, and Conjunto Rio Grande). The band's name, "Los Rieleros", is based on work that some members did on the railroads of Pecos, Texas. Unlike many other norteño bands, the Rieleros del Norte use both saxophone and accordion in their music, creating a dual-instrument hybrid. All original members of the band are natives of Ojinaga, Chihuahua, a town from which many other Norteño-Sax bands originated.

Currently, the band's leader is Daniel Esquivel; other members include: Daniel Esquivel Jr. playing the accordion, Jose Angel Esquivel playing electric bass, Alfredo Esquivel playing drums, Eugenio "Pemo" González playing the saxophone, and Jose Luis Esquivel Bajo Sexto. In the early years of the group, Polo Urías was the band's lead singer, but he left to form his own band, Polo Urías y su Maquina Norteña. Several years ago, the Rieleros ensemble had two bajo sexto players, one of whom was Manolo Morales – who eventually left to form his own band, Los Rieles. Los Rieleros del Norte also helped spin off La Maquinaria Norteña, which features three former members of the Polo Urias band. They also inspired Esquivel's singer/songwriter and producer cousin, Isac Esquivel, to join Sonic Ranch Studios, along with Christopher Schoemann and Christopher M. Carzoli.

Los Rieleros del Norte have recorded many albums over the years. These include; Estampida Norteña, Prieta Orgullosa, Aventura Pasada, and many other albums which have now become classics in regional Mexican music. Among their many songs, "El Columpio", "Te Quiero Mucho", "Amor Prohibido", "No le Digas a Nadie", "En la Puerta de Esa Casa", "Una Aventura" and, "Copa Sin Vino" are just some of their many singles, which have topped the Mexican music billboards. Sobre los Rieles was released in September 2004, featuring the hit "Tu Nuevo Cariñito". In July 2005, Que el Mundo Ruede was released as the Rieleros' newest album. In 2006 Siempre Imitado Jamas Igualado was released, featuring the song "Voy a llorar por ti", and on June 26, 2007, their new album, Ven Y Dime 25 años was released, featuring the single "Un Juego". On May 27, 2008, a new release of their latest work will be out, featuring "A punto de llorar", which has already been played on the radio, making a huge hit.

The actual founder of the band and its name is subject to controversy. Many fans have assumed that it was bassist Manalo Morales, but that probably isn't true. Current leader Daniel Esquivel and Manolo Morales himself reportedly denied this in a morning radio show called "Piolin por la mañana," acknowledging that Manuel "Meño" Lujan of Pecos is the original founder who named the group.

Lujan has maintained a low profile on this issue, so far preferring not to assert any legal right to ownership of the band's name. Meanwhile, the others have proceeded in court to establish control over the band. The group filed a suit in the Western District of Texas against Morales, Los Rieleros Del Norte, Inc. v. Morales et al, on March 21, 2007, for trademark infringement, to clarify this issue. Kathleen Cardone, a federal judge in El Paso, Texas, then gave all rights to Daniel Esquivel. The court order made Esquivel the rightful owner of the group and prohibited Morales from having any type of connection with the band, though Morales is rumored to have used the name of the group occasionally anyway. Armed with the court order, Esquivel consolidated his control of the band. His position was strengthened in early 2009 when, after 7 years of litigation, the Mexican courts also held that he was the band's rightful owner. The court order prohibited Morales from using the name Los Rieleros and prohibited him from performing any songs recorded by the group from 2002 onwards without permission. These decisions together gave Daniel Esquivel full ownership of the band in both the United States and Mexico. Esquivel later stated in a press conference that he was willing to work with Morales and his crew and even help them to record an album of their own material, as long as they use a different name for their group. So far, there is no indication that this has happened.

Discography
1982 Leonel Garcia
1983 La Eche En Un Carrito
1984 El Regalito
1985 Corazón Cerrado
1986 Copa Sin Vino
1987 Naci Cantando
1988 ...En Gira Internacional
1989 La Golosa
1990 Castillo de Ilusion
1991 A Toda Maquina
1991 Volando Alto
1992 Me Lo Contaron Ayer
1992 Pecado De Amor
1993 Vias Por Conocer
1994 Peor Que Nada
1994 De Bueno Lo Mejor
1994 Adelanté Camínate
1994 En La Calle Te Dejo
1995 Rifaré Mí Suerte
1996 Invencible
1997 El Maquinista
1997 Aventura Pasada
1998 La Moraleja
1999 De Corazon Norteño
2000 Prieta Orgullosa
2001 Entrega De Amor
2002 Cuesta Arriba2003 Abriendo Caminos2004 Sobre Los Rieles2005 Y Que El Mundo Ruede2006 Siempre Imitado, Jamas Igualado2007 Ven Y Dime2008 Pos Que No: Claro Que Si2008 Homenaje A Javier Solis2009 Pese A Quien Le Pese2009 En Vivo Para Ti2010 Ni El Diablo Te Va A Querer2012 Ayer, Hoy y Siempre2014 En Tus Manos 2015 Corridos Y Canciones De Mi Tierra''
2015 Las Clasicas De Ayer, Vol. 1
2016 Con Eso O Mas

See also
Daniel Esquivel

Related artists:
Ramon Ayala
Polo Urías
Adolfo Urias
Isac Esquivel
Los Diamantes de Ojinaga*
Los Bravos de Ojinaga*
La Maquinaria Norteña*
Conjunto Primavera*

References

External links
 Los Rieleros Del Norte Official Website
 Los Rieleros del Norte Fan Site
 Los Rieleros del Norte page at Fonovisa Records (Spanish only)
 Los Rieleros del Norte on Yahoo! music
 Yahoo! Music biography taken from allmusic.com
 Rieleros del Norte catalog on CD Universe, with sound samples

Mexican norteño musical groups
Latin Grammy Award winners
Fonovisa Records artists
1980 establishments in Mexico
Musical groups from Chihuahua (state)